Pir is a Nepali song composed and sung by Prakash Saput featuring Prakash Saput and Surakshya Panta on the lead; an aftermath of the Maoist armed forces who risked their lives to offer the country a new system and flung firearms but did not receive proper life they fought for, released on March 12, 2022.

Background and composition 
Pir was composed by Prakash Saput, sung by Prakash Saput and Samjhana Bhandari. The song contains a distinct folk rhythm.

Controversies 
The song had to face many controversies after its release due to its portrayal of ex female Maoist's as a sex worker. Many Maoist's personnel have condemned the way song has portrayed the lack of a female guerrilla fighting the Maoist people's war through prostitution. Plus the song is also alleged as a conspiracy to affect the Maoist's position in upcoming local election. Pushpa Kamal Dahal (Prachanda) chairman of CPN Maoist Centre has expressed his view to not oppose the song. After the controversy peaked, Prakash Saput censored and removed the wrangled scenes from the video and re-uploaded it to YouTube.

References

External links 

 "Pir" on YouTube

Nepalese songs
2022_songs
Nepali-language songs
Works about the Nepalese Civil War